Rúben Filipe dos Santos Vieira de Sousa Gonçalves (born 23 December 1998) is a Portuguese footballer who plays for Varzim as a midfielder.

Football career
Gonçalves made his professional debut with Rio Ave in a 2-1 Primeira Liga win over Vitória F.C. on 23 June 2020.

References

External links

1998 births
People from Valongo
Sportspeople from Porto District
Living people
Portuguese footballers
Association football midfielders
Rio Ave F.C. players
U.D. Vilafranquense players
Vitória F.C. players
Varzim S.C. players
Primeira Liga players
Liga Portugal 2 players
Campeonato de Portugal (league) players